Parish Ledge is a flat-topped ridge (1642 m) on the east side of Bratina Valley in Olympus Range, McMurdo Dry Valleys, Named by Advisory Committee on Antarctic Names (US-ACAN) (2004) after Thomas R. Parish, Department of Atmospheric Science, University of Wyoming, Laramie, WY, long-term United States Antarctic Program (USAP) investigator of Antarctic katabatic winds, 1981–97.

See also
Parish Riegel

References

Ridges of Victoria Land
McMurdo Dry Valleys